The SELA monoplane was an experimental monoplane built by Société d'Etude pour la Locomotion Aérienne (SELA) in the early 1910s. It was a middle-wing monoplane similar in layout to the Bleriot monoplanes.

Specifications

References

1910s French experimental aircraft
Single-engined tractor aircraft
Shoulder-wing aircraft
Aircraft first flown in 1911
Rotary-engined aircraft